62 may refer to: 
 62 (number)
 one of the years 62 BC, AD 62, 1962, 2062
 Maybach 62, a car
 M62 motorway in the UK
 "Sixty Two", a song by Karma to Burn from the album Mountain Czar, 2016